Guy Clapperton (born 1965) is a British journalist, speaker and author who contributes regularly to the national press on technology and business topics. He has written books on media interview skills, social media and smarter working.

Clapperton went to college at Brighton Polytechnic, now the University of Brighton. He began his career in the media with a staff job on MicroScope, a newspaper for the technology channel.  In 1993 he went freelance and worked for national press including The Guardian for which he still writes.

His first book in 2002 was titled Free Publicity For Your Business In A Week.  He wrote one of the first books on social media for business in the UK, This Is Social Media (Capstone Publishers 2009).  This led to speaking engagements for MPH bookstores and on a tour of five European countries supporting Adobe in its launch of its social media analytics product. The sequel, This Is Social Commerce, came out in 2012.  He became a Fellow of the Professional Speaking Association. In 2014 he and Philip Vanhoutte published The Smarter Working Manifesto, taking him to speak at the London Olympia launch, then at events in Berlin and Lisbon. Clapperton continues as a broadcaster, having offered commentary on the daily papers to the BBC News Channel between 2008 and 2013, and as a journalist for the Guardian, New Statesman and as editor of Professional Outsourcing Magazine.

He is also editorial director of Expedite Resourcing, a recruitment agency in the logistics sector of which he is also a shareholder.

Selected books
 Hacked About (Sunmakers), 
 This is Social Media (Capstone Publishers), 
 The Joy of Work (Psychology Press), 
  The Smarter Working Manifesto (Sunmakers), 
 This is Social Commerce (Capstone Publishers), 
 Free Publicity for your Business ... in a week (Hodder and Stoughton),

References

External links
Guy Clapperton web site
Guy Clapperton's Amazon page

1965 births
Living people
British motivational speakers
English male journalists
Alumni of the University of Brighton